Iraj Harirchi Tabrizi (born 1966) is an Iranian politician and surgeon. He is the lecturer at Tehran University of Medical Sciences at Tehran Cancer Institute. He is working as the deputy minister of Health and Medical Education.

2020 COVID-19 outbreak

During the COVID-19 pandemic in Iran, on 25 February, Harirchi announced that he had been diagnosed with COVID-19, and had self-quarantined. Just the day before, parliamentarian Ahmad Amirabadi Farahani's claimed that 50 people had died in Qom from COVID-19, which Harirchi denied. At the press conference, Harirchi was coughing and sweating. On 12 March, Saeed Namaki noted that Iraj Harirchi had fully recovered from the virus.

During the COVID-19 pandemic he said that Iran opposed quarantines, because they belonged to an era before the First World War  "to the plague, cholera, stuff like that". This statement was met with much criticism in universities as well as in social media.

References

1966 births
Living people
Iranian Vice Ministers
People from Tabriz